is a Japanese voice actor previously affiliated with Office CHK but now affiliated with Arts Vision . He is originally from Tokyo.

Voice roles

Television animation
Agatha Christie's Great Detectives Poirot and Marple (Major Norman, Bajjiwōsu, Inspector Prima)
Chaos Dragon (Emmael)
Cyborg 009 (2001 series) (Actor, man, staff, group members)
Detective School Q (Detective Tsuchida)
Digimon Tamers (Supervisory auditor (man in the black suit), Juri's father)
Elemental Gelade (Fiora's father)
Gals! (Kitakata)
Gokusen (Wakamatsu)
Ichiban Ushiro no Dai Maō (Mr.X)
Kingdom (Ze Gui)
Le Chevalier D'Eon (Teillagory)
Princess Tutu (Book person)
Skip Beat! (Taishou (Darumaya owner))
Tokyo Mew Mew (Tsukiko's boss)
Zatch Bell! (Shelby, Faūdo's heart)

Video games
Crash Bandicoot: Bakuso! Nitro Kart (Emperor Velo XXVII (Steven Blum), Doctor Nefarious Tropy (Michael Ensign))
Crash Twinsanity (Doctor Nefarious Tropy (Michael Ensign), Farmer Ernest (Alex Fernandez), others)
Radiata Stories (Zane)
Valkyrie Profile 2: Silmeria (Gyne)

Drama CDs
Café Latte Rhapsody (Bookstore Manager)

Dubbing roles

Live-action
The Agency (Carl Reese)
Austenland (Colonel Andrews (James Callis))
Dagon (Priest)
Die Another Day (DVD version) (Colonel Tan-Sun Moon (Will Yun Lee))
Guardians of the Galaxy Vol. 2 (Sovereign Admiral (Ben Browder))
Hank Zipzer (Mr. Love (Nick Mohammed))
John Q. (Steve Maguire (Kevin Connolly))
Night at the Museum: Secret of the Tomb (Dr. McPhee (Ricky Gervais))
The Shield (Shane Vendrell)
Tru Calling (Luc Johnston (Matthew Bomer))
Up in the Air (Steve (Zach Galifianakis))
Vigil (Mark Prentice (Adam James))
White Oleander (Bill)
X-Men: First Class (Levene (Demetri Goritsas))

Animation
The Mr. Men Show (Mr. Grumpy, Mr. Nervous, Mr. Nosy)
The Powerpuff Girls (Director, Amoeba, Snake, Jerome, Skinny, Mitch Mitchelson, others)
Regular Show (Pops)
X-Men (Beast, Bishop, Sabretooth)
X-Men: Evolution (Beast, Magneto, Juggernaut)

References

External links
 Haruo Satou at Office CHK 
 Haruo Satou at Arts Vision 
 

1961 births
Living people
Japanese male video game actors
Japanese male voice actors
Male voice actors from Tokyo
Arts Vision voice actors